William Lester Suff (born Bill Lee Suff; August 20, 1950), also known as The Riverside Prostitute Killer and The Lake Elsinore Killer, is an American serial killer.

Early crimes
In 1974, a Texas jury convicted Suff and his then-wife, Teryl, of beating their two-month-old daughter to death. The Texas Court of Criminal Appeals later reversed Teryl's conviction but upheld Suff's in Suff v. State (Tex. 1976) 531 S.W.2d 814, finding insufficient evidence to convict her as either the primary actor or a principal in their baby's murder.

Though Suff was sentenced to 70 years in a Texas prison, he served only ten years before his 1984 release on parole. He is currently incarcerated at San Quentin after having been convicted of killing twelve women in California and receiving the death penalty in 1995.

Murders
Suff was convicted of twelve counts of murders and one count of attempted murder. 

Rhonda Jetmore
On January 10, 1989, Rhonda Jetmore, 27, a prostitute, entered into a sexual transaction with Suff. The agreement turned violent when he began choking her. She struck him with a flashlight she had in her hand, causing Suff to lose his grip, allowing her to briefly escape. Suff tackled her to the ground and began ripping off her clothes. He stuck his finger in her mouth and she bit down, causing one of her teeth to break. Suff pulled back and Jetmore was able to run to the door, but was tackled again. As she pleaded with Suff to let her go, he lost track of his glasses. She used her flashlight to shine a light on them and when Suff went to pick them up, she ran out the door and flagged down a car. The passenger, who she happened to know, pulled out a gun and fired at Suff, and she was able to escape.

Kimberly Lyttle
On June 28, 1989, Kimberly Lyttle, 28, was found manually strangled to death on the side of the road in Lake Elsinore. Her autopsy revealed that she had been hit in the head, and she had cigarette burns on her arms and other areas of her body; all injuries occurring prior to her death. She was covered with a blue bath towel, which was found to have red, white, and blue fibers that were matched to a sleeping bag in Suff's van.

Christina Leal
On December 13, 1989, the body of Christina Leal, 23, was found strangled and stabbed to death on a Quail Valley hillside; she was last seen the night before. Her autopsy revealed marks around her wrists and ankles, indicating she was bound, scratch marks on her face, a black eye, four stab wounds in the middle of her chest, at least two knife wounds on her genitalia, and one of her nipples was partially removed; all antemortem. A lightbulb had been inserted into her uterus and was recovered intact.

Darla Jane Ferguson
On January 18, 1990, Darla Ferguson, 23, was found strangled in Riverside, just half a mile from the body of Kimberly Lyttle. She was found with her legs propped up and a trash bag pulled over the top half of her body, tied at the waist with a rope. Her wrists had been bound and she suffered blunt force trauma before death.

Carol Lynn Miller
On February 9, 1990, Carol Miller, 35, was found nude, with the exception of a shirt pulled over her head, in a grapefruit orchard in Highgrove. The frenulum connecting her upper lip to her gums was torn, indicating she was struggling while being smothered. She had no trauma to her neck. She was stabbed 5 times prior to death. Next to her body was a peeled and eaten grapefruit.

Cheryl Coker
On November 6, 1990, the body of Cheryl Coker, 33, was found in Riverside, partially inside a dumpster. She was found strangled to death, possibly with a wire, with such great force it cut the skin of her neck. Her right breast had been severed post-mortem and was found on a dirt road 30 feet away. A shoe print matching the size, shape, pattern, and wear of shoes belonging to Suff were found at the scene.

Susan Melissa Sternfeld
On December 21, 1990, Susan Sternfeld, 27, was found strangled, nude, and intentionally posed, near a dumpster in Riverside.

Kathleen Leslie Milne
On January 19, 1991, the body of Kathleen Milne, also known as Kathy Puckett, 42, was found nude, lying on a red robe, near a pile of trash, north of Lake Elsinore. A white sock had been stuffed in the back of her throat. Her death was ruled asphyxiation due to the combination of strangulation and the sock blocking her airway.

Sherry Ann Latham
On July 4, 1991, Sherry Latham, 37, was found nude, face down, in Lake Elsinore. Her cause of death was determined to be strangulation, but due to decomposition, no determination could be made on the method.

Kelly Marie Hammond
On August 16, 1991, Kelly Hammond, 27, of Rubidoux, was found strangled in an alley in Corona. Her nude body appeared to be posed; her right arm was bent and tucked under her abdomen, her left arm was bent with her hand on the ground and palm facing upward, her left leg was drawn to her chest, and her right leg was extended outward. She had two lacerations, which occurred prior to death, on her forehead. Her autopsy revealed her death to be caused by strangulation, with acute opiate intoxication a possible contributing factor.

Catherine McDonald
On September 13, 1991, Catherine McDonald, 30, the only black victim attributed to Suff, was found in Lake Elsinore. Her body was also posed; her legs were spread apart but her feet were together, her arms outstretched to the top of her head. She was four months pregnant. Before she died, she was stabbed in the chest three times. She also had a gaping cut on the left side of her neck. Her right breast was removed post-mortem, and she suffered a stab wound, as well as other lacerations, to her genitals, some before and some after death. Her official cause of death was multiple stab wounds to the neck as well as compression. Shoe prints of the same pattern as the other murders were also near McDonald's body.

Delliah Zamora
On October 30, 1991, the body of Delliah Zamora, 35, was found strangled in Glen Avon. She had fingernail injuries consistent with clawing at a ligature, though method was unable to be determined. Her larynx was crushed and broken down the middle, which would require an extreme amount of pressure.

Eleanor Casares
On December 23, 1991, Eleanor Casares, 39, was found in an orange grove in Riverside. She was stabbed in the chest and strangled. Her breast was removed post-mortem.

A number of additional murders were attributed to Suff, though he was never charged, with the exception of Cherie Payseur.:

Michelle Yvette Gutierrez
On October 29, 1986, Michelle Gutierrez, 26, was found in a drainage ditch in the Riverside area.

Charlotte Jean Palmer
On December 10, 1986, Charlotte Palmer, 25, was found near Romoland. Though cause of death could not be determined, authorities believe she was smothered.

Linda Ann Ortega
On April 29, 1988, the nude body of Linda Ortega, 37, was found stabbed to death near the rodeo grounds in Lake Elsinore.

Martha Bess Young
On May 2, 1988, the nude body of Martha Young, 27, of Albuquerque, was found just a few miles away from Linda Ortega. Her cause of death was determined to be a combination of strangulation and overdose of amphetamines. She was previously reported missing, first by her boyfriend, Joseph Shiflitt, who called her mother on April 10, 1988, and then officially by her mother, 17 days later.

Diane Mae Talavera
On January 17, 1989, Diana Talavera, 37, was found strangled on the beach in Lake Elsinore.

Julie Lynn Angel
On November 11, 1989, the body of Julie Angel, 36, was found bludgeoned to death in Alberhill, on a street her mother drove every day for work.

Cherie Michelle Payseur
On April 27, 1991, Cherie Payseur, 24, was found on a flower bed behind a bowling alley in Riverside. She was initially found nude, but a patron covered the body with a jean jacket before police arrived. She had been hit in the face, and though no official cause of death could be determined, she was thought to have been suffocated. A number of shoe prints were left at the scene, including a partial shoe print on the small of Payseur's back. The analyzed shoe impressions were thought to be the same as the prints from the scene of Cheryl Coker's murder. The semen collected from Payseur's body revealed two donors, ultimately requiring the results to be deemed inconclusive, though the most intensive bands matched that of Suff; as such he could not be excluded as a donor. Suff was charged with Payseur's murder, however, the jury remained deadlocked and he was not convicted.

Arrest
Suff subsequently raped, tortured, stabbed, strangled, and sometimes mutilated 12 or more women in Riverside County between June 28, 1989, and December 23, 1991. On January 9, 1992, Suff was arrested after a routine traffic stop when a police officer found a bloody knife and objects believed to be related to the killings.

Suff worked as a warehouse clerk for Riverside County when he was arrested, having been hired while still on parole from Texas. During his time in this job, Suff delivered office furniture to the officers on the task force investigating his killing spree.

Trial
On July 19, 1995, a Riverside County jury found Suff guilty of killing 12 women and attempting to kill another, though police suspected him of being responsible for as many as 22 deaths. Suff did not testify in his defense. During the penalty phase that followed, the prosecutor presented evidence linking Suff to the 1988 murder of a San Bernardino woman, as well as evidence that despite his prior Texas prison term for murdering his first daughter, he abused and violently shook his three-month-old daughter by his second wife. On August 17, 1995, after deliberating for only 10 minutes, the jury returned verdicts of guilty on 12 murder counts and on one count of attempted murder.

The jury could not unanimously agree to find him guilty on a 13th count of murder. On October 26, 1995, the trial court followed the jury's verdict and ordered Suff condemned to death. Suff resides on death row at San Quentin State Prison.

His 2014 appeal of the sentence was rejected by the California Supreme Court, which upheld the death penalty.

Victims

Book and TV
The Riverside Killer by Christine Keers and Dennis St Pierre was published in 1996 by Pinnacle True Crime.

In 1997 Cat and Mouse - Mind Games with a Serial Killer was published by Dove Books. Suff met with author Brian Alan Lane and told his story. The book includes short stories and poems written by Suff and photos of several of his victims.

Suff is the subject of the television program "Real Detective," season 2, episode 2. The 40-minute program includes dramatic recreations and interviews with the lead detective of the Riverside Taskforce, Det. Bob Creed. The episode first aired on March 9, 2017. He is also profiled as part of the Amazon Prime 2013 Documentary "Serial Killers Defined."

The case was the subject of an episode of The New Detectives, Born to Kill? and the Most Evil Killers.

See also 
 List of serial killers in the United States
 List of serial killers by number of victims

References

External links
 "19th Victim Is Linked to a Killer," New York Times, December 26, 1991.
 "Man Charged in Prostitute Slayings in California," New York Times, January 15, 1992.
 "Suspect in 19 Killings Indicted in California," New York Times, July 29, 1992.
 "Man Is Indicted in 14 Killings in California," New York Times, July 30, 1992.
 "Californian Is Guilty in Killing of 12 Prostitutes," New York Times, July 20, 1995.
 "Jury Asks for Death Penalty for Convicted Killer of 12 Women," New York Times, August 20, 1995.
 "Killer of Prostitutes Gets Death Sentence," New York Times, October 29, 1995.

1950 births
20th-century American criminals
American male criminals
American murderers of children
American people convicted of murder
American prisoners sentenced to death
American rapists
American serial killers
Crimes against sex workers in the United States
Criminals from Los Angeles
Filicides in Texas
Living people
Male serial killers
Murder in Riverside County, California
People convicted of murder by California
People from Riverside, California
Prisoners sentenced to death by California